The 2013 IIHF Inline Hockey World Championship Division I was an international inline hockey tournament run by the International Ice Hockey Federation. The Division I tournament ran alongside the 2013 IIHF Inline Hockey World Championship and took place between 2 and 8 June 2013 in Dresden, Germany. The tournament was won by Great Britain who upon winning gained promotion to the 2014 IIHF Inline Hockey World Championship. While Bulgaria and Argentina were relegated after finishing last and second last respectively.

Qualification
Six teams attempted to qualify for the two remaining spots in the 2013 IIHF InLine Hockey World Championship Division I tournament. The other six nations automatically qualified after their results from the 2012 World Championship and the 2012 Division I tournaments. Two qualification tournaments were held with a place awarded to the winner of each tournament. The European Qualification tournament was contested between Bulgaria, Latvia, Macedonia and Turkey, with Bulgaria winning promotion and returning to Division I after being relegated last year. The Rest of the World Qualification tournament was contested between Argentina and Brazil, with Argentina winning promotion. In addition to the Rest of the World tournament Argentina B, Colombia, Uruguay and Venezuela joined Argentina and Brazil in a South American invitational tournament.

 − Winner of the Rest of the World Qualification
 − Finished fifth in 2012 World Championship Division I
 − Finished third in 2012 World Championship Division I
 − Winner of the European Qualification
 − Finished fourth in 2012 World Championship Division I
 − Relegated from the 2012 World Championship
 − Finished second in 2012 World Championship Division I
 − Finished sixth in 2012 World Championship Division I

European Qualification
The European Qualification tournament was held at the Winter Palace in Sofia, Bulgaria from 3 August 2012 to 5 August 2012. Bulgaria gained promotion to Division I after winning all of their games and finishing first in the standings. Latvia finished in second place after winning two of their games and losing the third against Bulgaria in overtime.

All times are local.

Rest of the World Qualification
The Rest of the World Qualification tournament was held in Buenos Aires, Argentina on 13 and 14 December 2012. Argentina gained promotion to Division I after winning both of their games against Brazil.

All times are local.

South American invitational tournament
Following the Rest of the World tournament Argentina hosted a South American invitational tournament in Buenos Aires. Argentina B, Colombia, Uruguay and Venezuela joined Argentina and Brazil for the tournament. Brazil won the competition after defeating Colombia 5–3 in the final and Argentina beat Argentina B to finish third.

Preliminary round

5th placement

Semifinals

3rd placement

1st placement

Seeding and groups
The seeding in the preliminary round was based on the final standings at the 2012 IIHF InLine Hockey World Championship and 2012 IIHF InLine Hockey World Championship Division I. Division I's groups are named Group C and Group D while the 2013 IIHF Inline Hockey World Championship use Group A and Group B, as both tournaments are held in Dresden, Germany. The teams were grouped accordingly by seeding at the previous year's tournament (in parenthesis is the corresponding seeding):

Group C
 (9)
 (12)
 (13)
 (16)

Group D
 (10)
 (11)
 (14)
 (15)

Preliminary round
Eight participating teams were placed in the following two groups. After playing a round-robin, every team advanced to the Playoff round.

All times are local (UTC+2).

Group C

Group D

Playoff round
All eight teams advanced into the playoff round and were seeded into the quarterfinals according to their result in the preliminary round. The winning quarterfinalists advanced through to the semifinals, while the losing teams moved through to the placement round. Bulgaria and Argentina were relegated after losing their placement round games, while Croatia finished fifth after defeating Bulgaria and Japan finished sixth following their win over Argentina. In the semifinals Great Britain defeated Australia and Austria beat Hungary, both advancing to the gold medal game. After losing the semifinals Australia and Hungary played off for the bronze medal with Hungary winning 7–5. Great Britain defeated Austria 5–1 in the gold medal game and earned promotion to the 2014 IIHF Inline Hockey World Championship.

All times are local (UTC+2).

Quarterfinals

Placement round

Semifinals

Bronze medal game

Gold medal game

Ranking and statistics

Final standings
The final standings of the tournament according to IIHF:

Tournament Awards
Best players selected by the directorate:
Best Goalkeeper:  Lorenz Hirn
Best Defenseman:  Antony Collins
Best Forward:  Philip Hamer

Scoring leaders
List shows the top skaters sorted by points, then goals. If the list exceeds 10 skaters because of a tie in points, all of the tied skaters are shown.

Leading goaltenders
Only the top five goaltenders, based on save percentage, who have played at least 40% of their team's minutes are included in this list.

References

External links

Division I at IIHF.com

IIHF InLine Hockey World Championship Division I
2013 in inline hockey
IIHF InLine Hockey World Championship
Sport in Dresden
IIHF InLine Hockey World Championship Division I
Inline hockey in Germany